Dražen Silić (born 25 May 1985) is a Croatian bobsledder. He competed in the two-man event at the 2018 Winter Olympics.

References

1985 births
Living people
Croatian male bobsledders
Olympic bobsledders of Croatia
Bobsledders at the 2018 Winter Olympics
Place of birth missing (living people)
21st-century Croatian people